Team LeBron may refer to teams captained by basketball player LeBron James in:
2018 NBA All-Star Game
2019 NBA All-Star Game
2020 NBA All-Star Game
2021 NBA All-Star Game
2022 NBA All-Star Game
2023 NBA All-Star Game